Yanina Aguilar (born February 15, 1977) is a beach volleyball player from Costa Rica, who played at the  2006 Central American and Caribbean Games playing with Nathalia Alfaro finishing 8th.

At her home country, she won five beach volleyball Championships, between 1995 and 2004.

She played Indoor Volleyball with her National Team at the 2006 Pan American Cup.

References

 Costa Rican Beach Volleyball Association

1977 births
Living people
Costa Rican women's volleyball players
Costa Rican beach volleyball players
Costa Rican women's beach volleyball players